Bukovica Mala may refer to:

 Bukovica Mala (Derventa), a village in Bosnia and Herzegovina
 Bukovica Mala (Doboj), a village in Bosnia and Herzegovina